Texas de Brazil is a family owned churrascaria (Brazilian steakhouse) restaurant chain with locations both internationally and domestically. It debuted October 13, 1998 in Addison, Texas, a suburb of Dallas. The restaurant is a Brazilian-American “churrascaria,” or steakhouse that combines the cuisines of southern Brazil with Texan style meats.  Customers turn a piece of paper green side up to get meat, or red side up to no longer receive meat.

Menu

The meats at this restaurant consist of roasted and seasoned cuts of beef, pork, lamb, chicken and Brazilian sausage. The meats are cooked over an open flame grill, a technique which comes from southern Brazil, where employees dressed as gauchos bring meats individually to tables. Texas de Brazil does not serve chicken hearts, often considered a traditional food found at many other churrascarias. The restaurant also prepares and serves several types of desserts.

See also
List of barbecue restaurants
List of Texas companies
List of companies in Dallas

References

Further reading
 Dining Out: Texas de Brazil in Syracuse | syracuse.com
 Texas de Brazil to begin dishing out endless menu of beef at Easton Town Center – Columbus – Business First
 Texas de Brazil steakhouse announces January opening for first Birmingham location | AL.com
 Texas de Brazil to open this January in Uptown – Birmingham Business Journal

External links
 

Brazilian restaurants
Companies based in Dallas
Restaurants established in 1998
Steakhouses in the United States
Theme restaurants
Brazilian-American culture
1998 establishments in Texas